John McIntosh Kell (January 26, 1823 – October 5, 1900) was an officer in the Confederate navy during the American Civil War, during which time Kell was First Lieutenant and Executive Officer of the commerce raider .

Early life
John McIntosh Kell was born near Darien, Georgia on January 26, 1823, the son of John and Margery Spalding Baillie Kell. He spent his childhood at Laurel Grove Plantation and with his great uncle Thomas Spalding, whose family owned a large part of Sapelo Island.

Career
Kell was appointed midshipman at the age of 17 in the United States Navy on September 9, 1841. He would serve in the Mexican War, was a member of the expedition of Commodore Matthew Perry to Japan in 1853 and Master of the flagship  on the cruise home. When Georgia seceded from the Union in early 1861, Lieutenant Kell resigned from the United States Navy and was the first Naval officer to render his services to the Confederate States.

In April 1861, he commanded the Georgia state gunboat ; but received a Confederate States Navy commission as First Lieutenant the following month and was sent to New Orleans. He then served as executive officer of the  under the command of Captain Raphael Semmes during Sumters commerce raiding voyage during 1861–62.

He was rescued by the British yacht Dearhound and taken to England. Promoted to the rank of Commander in that month, he commanded the ironclad  in the James River Squadron in 1865.

After the war

After the end of the Civil War, Kell returned home to Georgia and became a farmer. Later years, he served as Adjutant General of Georgia. He wrote his memoir, Recollections of a Naval Life Including the Cruises of Confederate Steamers "Sumter" and "Alabama" near the end of his life, It was released in 1900.

John McIntosh Kell died at his home in Sunnyside, Georgia on October 5, 1900, and is buried in Oak Hill Cemetery, Griffin, Georgia.

Honors
The John McIntosh Kell Camp #107 of the Sons of Confederate Veterans located in Griffin, Georgia, is named in his memory and honor on July 18, 1898.

Papers
The Georgia Historical Society holds the papers of John McIntosh Kell and his wife, Julia Blanche Munroe Kell.
 John McIntosh Kell Papers
 Julia Blanche Munroe Kell papers

See also
 Bibliography of early American naval history
 Bibliography of the American Civil War
 List of ships captured in the 19th century

References

Sources

External links
 

1823 births
1900 deaths
CSS Alabama
People from Darien, Georgia
United States Navy personnel of the Mexican–American War
People of Georgia (U.S. state) in the American Civil War
19th-century American naval officers
Confederate States Navy commanders
19th-century American memoirists